Maria Antonia of Naples and Sicily (14 December 1784  21 May 1806) was the youngest surviving daughter of Ferdinand, King of Naples and Sicily, and Maria Carolina of Austria. As the wife of the future Ferdinand VII of Spain, then heir apparent to the Spanish throne, she held the title of Princess of Asturias. It is said that her mother-in-law, Maria Luisa of Parma, poisoned her, causing her death, but there is no evidence to prove this.

Early life
Born at the Caserta Palace in Caserta, Italy, Maria Antonia was the youngest daughter of King Ferdinand IV/III of Naples and Sicily and his first wife, Maria Carolina of Austria. Named after her mother's favorite sister, Queen Marie Antoinette of France, she was an intelligent girl, having by the age of seventeen learned several languages.

Marriage 

In a series of dynastic alliances, Maria Antonia became engaged to Infante Ferdinand, Prince of Asturias (who later became King Ferdinand VII of Spain), while her eldest brother, Francis, became engaged to Infante Ferdinand's sister, Infanta Maria Isabella of Spain. On 6 October 1802, Maria Antonia married Infante Ferdinand in Barcelona, Spain.

Princess of Asturias

The princess failed to provide the expected heir to the throne: her two pregnancies, in 1804 and 1805, ended in miscarriages. Her mother, Maria Carolina, was highly anti-French after the execution of her sister and brother-in-law during the French Revolution. She was also strongly opposed to the military expansion of the French republic. As Spain became more easily dominated by Napoleon Bonaparte, there were rumours that Maria Carolina wanted her daughter to poison the Queen of Spain and Manuel Godoy, Spain's prime minister. However, as with most poison rumours of the period, it is unlikely to be true, not least because both women were devout Roman Catholics and secondly because the Spanish court's ties to France were in no way greater or lesser than most in Europe's after Napoleon’s early victories. Maria Antonia's mother-in-law, Queen Maria Luisa, disliked her daughter-in-law and she encouraged rumours of a Habsburg poisoning plot, even subjecting her books and clothes to scrutiny in order to discredit her daughter-in-law further. In spite of all of this campaign of character assassination, Maria Antonia managed to gain considerable influence over her husband and created an opposition party against Queen Maria Luisa and Godoy.

Death
Maria Antonia died of tuberculosis on 21 May 1806 at the Royal Palace of Aranjuez in Aranjuez, Spain, at the age of 21. It was rumoured that Maria Antonia had been poisoned by Queen Maria Luisa and Manuel Godoy, although there is no actual evidence to support this claim. However, Queen Maria Carolina, who was devastated, truly believed this. Maria Antonia's father, King Ferdinand, consolidated Naples and Sicily into the Kingdom of the Two Sicilies a decade after her death.

The Neapolitan princess was buried at El Escorial in Spain. Her husband was to marry three more times: –

Infanta Maria Isabel of Portugal in Madrid on 29 September 1816; the couple had a daughter who died young.
Maria Josepha Amalia of Saxony on 20 October 1819, who bore him no children.
Maria Antonia's niece (born a month before her death), Princess Maria Christina of Naples and Sicily (more often known as of the Two Sicilies) with whom Ferdinand had the future Isabella II of Spain.

Ancestry

References

Bibliography
 EPTON, Nina, The Spanish mousetrap: Napoleon and the Court of Spain (London: Macdonald, 1973).
 HILT, Douglas, The troubled trinity: Godoy and the Spanish monarchs (Tuscaloosa; London: University of Alabama Press, 1987).

External links

1784 births
1806 deaths
Burials in the Pantheon of Infantes at El Escorial
19th-century deaths from tuberculosis
House of Bourbon-Two Sicilies
House of Bourbon (Spain)
Italian Roman Catholics
Neapolitan princesses
People from Caserta
Princesses of Asturias
Sicilian princesses
Spanish infantas
Tuberculosis deaths in Spain
Daughters of kings